George Stott (6 October 1888 – 14 March 1969) was a British wrestler. He competed in the freestyle featherweight event at the 1924 Summer Olympics.

References

1888 births
1969 deaths
Olympic wrestlers of Great Britain
Wrestlers at the 1924 Summer Olympics
British male sport wrestlers
Sportspeople from Bradford